The Quillayute River (also spelled Quileute River) is a river situated on the Olympic Peninsula in Washington.  It empties to the Pacific Ocean at La Push, Washington. The Quillayute River is formed by the confluence of the Bogachiel River, Calawah River and the Sol Duc River. The Dickey River joins the Quillayute just above the river's mouth on the Pacific Ocean.

At the confluence of the Sol Duc and Bogachiel rivers the use of the Quillayute name ends, although the river continues far into the interior.

The name "Quillayute" comes from the Quileute people. In the Quileute language the name is /kʷoʔlíːyot'/, which perhaps derived from /kʷolíː/ ("wolves"), and was the name of a village at La Push.

The Quillayute River is the current, traditional, and ancestral center of the territory of the Quileute Native Tribe, which before European settlement occupied the entire drainage basin (plus that of the Hoh River).  Presently the natives live at the town of La Push on their small treaty reservation which adjoins the south shore of the river at the mouth.

The final  at the mouth of the Quillayute pass through the narrow coastal strip of the Olympic National Park.  Park roads lead to the Mora and Rialto Beach recreation area on the north side of the Quillayute. There are camping and picnicking facilities, public parking, and trailhead access to the coastal wilderness strip north of the river.

See also

 List of Washington rivers
 Quillayute Canyon

References

Rivers of Washington (state)
Rivers of Clallam County, Washington
Washington placenames of Native American origin